Romain Cardis (born 12 August 1992 in Melun) is a French cyclist, who currently rides for UCI Continental team . He was named in the startlist for the 2016 Vuelta a España.

Major results

2014
 5th Primus Classic Impanis-Van Petegem
2015
 1st  Overall Tour du Loir-et-Cher
1st  Points classification
1st Young rider classification
1st Stages 2 & 4
 10th Overall Tour de Gironde
2017
 4th Grand Prix de la Somme
 6th Primus Classic
2018
 1st Stage 1 Tour de Wallonie
2019
 8th Omloop van het Houtland
 10th Grand Prix de Denain
2020
 2nd Grand Prix d'Isbergues
 10th Scheldeprijs
2021
 1st Paris–Troyes
 4th Grand Prix de la ville de Pérenchies
 7th Grand Prix d'Isbergues
 8th Grand Prix du Morbihan
 9th Cholet-Pays de la Loire
 10th Boucles de l'Aulne
2022
 8th Overall Circuit de la Sarthe
 9th Grand Prix d'Isbergues
2023
 8th Classic Loire Atlantique
 4th Cholet-Pays de la Loire

Grand Tour general classification results timeline

References

External links

Sportspeople from Melun
1992 births
Living people
French male cyclists
Cyclists from Île-de-France
20th-century French people
21st-century French people